Anthony Connelly serves as the Chief Financial Officer to the Villages; America's premier Active Adult Retirement Community located in Central Florida. 

Prior to leading the Villages, Anthony was the president of New Vacation Operations and Disney Cruise Line for Walt Disney Parks and Resorts. Connelly previously served as senior vice president of operations for DCL.

Connelly began his Disney career in 1989. He has served as the executive vice president of Walt Disney Imagineering, the senior vice president and chief operations officer of Disney Cruise Line, and the senior vice president and chief financial officer for Disney's U.S. Parks and Resorts.

He has a Master of Business Administration from The Wharton School of the University of Pennsylvania and is also a certified public accountant.

References

Walt Disney Parks and Resorts people
Disney executives